Orsonwelles torosus is a species of linyphiid spider endemic to Kauai in the Hawaiian Islands. It was described in 1900 by the French naturalist Eugène Simon based on a specimen collected in the 1890s, but has not been collected since, and is presumed extinct.

References

Linyphiidae
Spiders of Hawaii
Endemic fauna of Hawaii
Biota of Kauai
Spiders described in 1900